Moskwa is a Polish punk-rock band.

Moskwa may also refer to:
 Moskwa, Łódź Voivodeship, a village in Poland
 Moskwa (surname)

See also